The Agricultural Food and Allied Democratic Workers Union (AFADWU) is a trade union representing food processing workers in South Africa.

The union was founded in 2016 after the dismissal of an army of worker leaders, shop stewards and officials by the Food and Allied Workers Union (FAWU).  FAWU also disaffiliated from the Congress of South African Trade Unions (COSATU).

AFADWU is an association of employees whose principal purpose is to regulate relations between employees and employers, including any employers' organisations. On the 17th of April 2018, AFADWU was legally registered with the Department of Employment and Labour in terms of the Labour Relations Act No 66 of 1995 as amended.

In 2018, AFADWU was accepted as an affiliate of COSATU.

Leadership

2020 (Current Officeholders)

Current National Office Bearers

Current Provincial Secretaries 
Eastern Cape: Victor Mbaza | Free State: Thulani Klass | Gauteng: Lucas Mbambo | KwaZulu-Natal: Mtokhona Ngcobo | Limpopo: Jan Maifala | Mpumalanga: Elias Mgwenya | Western Cape: Michael Helu

2018 (Previous Officeholders)

Previous National Office Bearers

Campaigns 
Buy Local Campaign

AFADWU, the FairPlay Movement, Proudly South African and other trade unions have launched a campaign to promote the consumption of local chicken.

References 

Congress of South African Trade Unions
Trade unions based in Johannesburg
Trade unions in South Africa
African Regional Organisation of the International Trade Union Confederation
National trade union centres of South Africa
Trade unions established in 2016